Montreux is a municipality in Switzerland.

Montreux may also refer to:

 Montreux, Meurthe-et-Moselle, a town in France
 Montreux Convention Regarding the Regime of the Straits, an international agreement governing the passage of ships through the Bosphorus and Dardanelles Straits
 Montreux Document, a 2008 agreement between countries obligations regarding private military and security companies in war zones
 Montreux Record,  a register of wetland sites on the List of Wetlands of International Importance

Entertainment
 Montreux (band), a chamber jazz ensemble
 The Montreux EP by Simply Red
 Montreux Jazz Festival, an annual music festival held in Switzerland
 Montreux Festival (album), a blues album

See also
 Live at Montreux (disambiguation)